Frank Liddell (born 10 July 1953) is a Scottish former professional footballer who played as a centre-back.

Early life
Liddell was born in Stirling, and grew up in the village of Fallin.

Career
After playing for Dunipace, he joined Alloa Athletic in 1975, where he played part time whilst working as a miner, and was part of the team that finished second in the 1976–77 Scottish Second Division and won promotion to the Scottish First Division. Having recently taken up a job as an inspector at an aluminium plant, he instead became a full-time footballer by signing for Scottish Premier Division side Heart of Midlothian for a fee of £15,000. After they were relegated in the 1978–79 season to the Scottish First Division, he scored their title-winning goal in the 1979–80 season against Airdrieonians on 30 April 1980 as they were promoted back to the first tier.

He left to join Brisbane City in the 1981–82 season, before returning to Scotland and having spells at Dunfermline Athletic, Stenhousemuir, St Johnstone. He returned to Brisbane City in 1986, where he would finish his career.

Personal life
Since retiring from professional football, Liddell has remained in Brisbane and has become a financial advisor.

References

1953 births
Living people
Scottish footballers
Scottish miners
Footballers from Stirling
Association football defenders
Dunipace F.C. players
Alloa Athletic F.C. players
Heart of Midlothian F.C. players
Brisbane City FC players
Dunfermline Athletic F.C. players
Stenhousemuir F.C. players
St Johnstone F.C. players
Scottish Football League players
Scottish expatriate footballers
Expatriate soccer players in Australia
Scottish expatriate sportspeople in Australia